Hypostomus garmani is a species of catfish in the family Loricariidae. It is native to South America, where it occurs in the São Francisco River basin. The species reaches 13 cm (5.1 inches) SL and is believed to be a facultative air-breather.

References 

garmani
Fish of the São Francisco River basin
Species described in 1904